The Roman Catholic Diocese of Yola is a diocese located in the city of Yola in Adamawa state and in the Ecclesiastical province of Jos, Plateau state, Nigeria.

History
 July 14, 1950: Established as Apostolic Prefecture of Yola from the Diocese of Buéa in Cameroon, the Apostolic Prefecture of Jos and the Apostolic Prefecture of Oturkpo
 July 2, 1962: Promoted as Diocese of Yola

Special churches
The Cathedral is St Theresa's Cathedral in Yola.

Bishops
 Prefect Apostolic of Yola (Roman rite)
 Father Patrick Joseph Dalton, O.S.A. (1950.10.27 – 1962.07.02 see below)
 Bishops of Yola
 Bishop Patrick Joseph Dalton, O.S.A. (see above 1962.07.02 – 1969.11.29)
 Bishop Patrick Francis Sheehan, O.S.A. (1970.09.21 – 1996.07.05), appointed Vicar Apostolic of Kano
 Bishop Christopher Shaman Abba (1996.07.05 - 2010.01.09)
 Bishop Stephen Dami Mamza (2011.02.18 - )

Other priests of this diocese who became bishop
Charles Michael Hammawa, appointed Bishop of Jalingo in 2008
Matthew Man-oso Ndagoso, appointed Bishop of Maiduguri in 2003

See also
Roman Catholicism in Nigeria

Sources
 GCatholic.org Information
 Catholic Hierarchy

Roman Catholic dioceses in Nigeria
Christian organizations established in 1950
Roman Catholic dioceses and prelatures established in the 20th century
Adamawa State
1950 establishments in Nigeria
Roman Catholic Ecclesiastical Province of Jos